Jacques Demers (born July 27, 1960) is a Canadian weightlifter. He was born in Montreal. He won a silver medal in the men's middleweight category (75 kg) at the 1984 Summer Olympics.

On 31 October 1983, Demers and fellow Canadian weightlifters Terrence Hadlow, Michel Pietracupa, and Mario Parente were detained at Montreal's Mirabel Airport after Canadian Customs Agents discovered a cache or anabolic steroids in their luggage. More than 22,000 Dianabol tablets and 400 vials of synthetic testosterone were seized. All four men were charged with importing pharmaceutical drugs with the intent to distribute under Canada's Food and Drug Act. Unfettered by the impending charges against him, Demers went on to earn a silver medal in the 75-kg class at the 1984 Summer Olympics in Los Angeles.

References

1960 births
Living people
Sportspeople from Montreal
Canadian male weightlifters
Commonwealth Games bronze medallists for Canada
Weightlifters at the 1982 Commonwealth Games
Pan American Games silver medalists for Canada
Weightlifters at the 1983 Pan American Games
Olympic weightlifters of Canada
Olympic silver medalists for Canada
Weightlifters at the 1984 Summer Olympics
Doping cases in weightlifting
Canadian sportspeople in doping cases
Olympic medalists in weightlifting
Medalists at the 1984 Summer Olympics
Commonwealth Games medallists in weightlifting
Pan American Games medalists in weightlifting
Medalists at the 1983 Pan American Games
20th-century Canadian people
21st-century Canadian people
Medallists at the 1982 Commonwealth Games